Cristián Moll Ramírez (born 13 March 1993) is a Chilean handball player for Sant Joan and the Chilean national team.

References

1993 births
Living people
Chilean male handball players
Handball players at the 2015 Pan American Games
Pan American Games bronze medalists for Chile
Pan American Games medalists in handball
Expatriate handball players
Chilean expatriate sportspeople in Spain
South American Games bronze medalists for Chile
South American Games medalists in handball
Competitors at the 2018 South American Games
Medalists at the 2015 Pan American Games
21st-century Chilean people
20th-century Chilean people